Schicklgruber is a surname.  Notable people with the surname include:

Alois Schicklgruber, better known as Alois Hitler, Austrian civil servant and the father of Adolf Hitler
Josef Schicklgruber (born 1967), Austrian footballer
Maria Schicklgruber (1795–1847), the paternal grandmother of Adolf Hitler

See also
Hitler family